UCI Cinemas (United Cinemas International) is a brand of cinema, currently operating in Germany, Italy, Portugal, and Brazil, which has been owned since 2004 by Odeon Cinemas Group, whose owner is now AMC Theatres, except for the UCI Cinemas Brazil which also from the same year is owned by National Amusements.

History

The organization was announced in October 1988 as a joint venture between United Artists Theaters, United International Pictures (a partnership of Paramount Pictures, Metro-Goldwyn-Mayer and Universal Pictures), and AMC Theatres, to operate, under the AMC brand, 200 screens in the UK and Ireland with 3 new cinemas opening in Bochum, Bremen and Cologne in West Germany and a further 150 screens planned in the UK and Ireland by 1991. However, AMC pulled out of the joint venture in December 1988, and sold their U.K. assets, including their 12 cinemas, to the new entity for $98 million instead and withdrew from the UK market, with the joint venture now known as Cinema International Corp./United Artists Communications Inc. The name was shortened the following year to United Cinemas International and they were based in Manchester, England, operating 86 cinemas initially. The chain managed CIC's flagship cinemas in London, the Empire, Leicester Square and the Plaza, however, these were still owned by CIC.

In the UK, the company operated cinemas under the UCI and (later) thefilmworks brands, and initially enjoyed a sizeable market share. They took over the first multiplex cinema opened in the UK by AMC at The Point in Milton Keynes in 1985, and were one of the first to purchase a digital projector – costing a massive £130,000 – one out of only 30 worldwide. This enabled them to download films via satellite, and also play digital media disks rather than film. Under chairman Tom McGrath, the group expanded to build and operate cinemas in Brazil, China, Germany, Ireland, Italy, Japan, Portugal, Spain, Taiwan, and the UK.

The cinemas were, by and large, fairly simplistic in design and seemed steeped in 1980s traditions that quickly became dated. However, a later purchase by Terra Firma (see below) saw the chain merged with Odeon cinemas and henceforth adopting the far plusher Odeon style.

In late 2004, the European division of UCI was bought by Terra Firma Capital Partners, along with rival chain Odeon Cinemas. The majority of UK UCI and thefilmworks cinemas were re-branded to use the Odeon name. As a condition of the merger with Odeon Cinemas (imposed by the Office of Fair Trading), UCI Clydebank, UCI Poole, UCI Sutton, UCI Basildon, The Empire Leicester Square and thefilmworks High Wycombe were sold to Empire Cinemas. Since the merger has been completed, few elements of former UCI cinemas still retain the UCI look and feel, they now almost all share the standard Odeon design cues, except for a handful of the former "Filmworks" brand whose designs did not lend themselves well to an Odeon "look". The UCI, UCI/Kinowelt and Cinesa brands will remain in Ireland and the rest of Europe. UCI Hull was evicted at around this time due to redevelopment. As there was already an Odeon there, it was not replaced.

UCI's Brazilian cinemas were acquired, also in 2004, by American conglomerate National Amusements, who also owned the Showcase chain of cinemas in other regions of the world. Because of this, Coca-Cola beverages sold in those cinemas were replaced by Pepsi, coincidentally Showcase's beverages. They continued to share similarities to Showcase in later years, such as some of the same looks and visual identities. Their biggest cinema in Brazil and the biggest in Brazil, in general, is the New York City Center cinema in Rio de Janeiro, with 18 screens, including IMAX, 4DX, De Lux and XPlus screens. Some screens also have SuperSeats (These last three are similarities between Showcase and UCI Brazil).

Irish cinemas, although retaining the UCI name, were managed as part of Odeon Cinemas and introduced parts of their offer, such as Premier seating and the Odeon in-house magazine, "Onscreen". Advertising contained the Odeon logo font in many cases. In August 2007, UCI launched a new Irish website with an identical layout to odeon.co.uk. The Irish cinemas were sold to an Irish group, Entertainment Enterprises, in September 2006, but continued to be run by Odeon under a management contract. In April 2008, Entertainment Enterprises announced that it would be acquiring the Storm Cinemas chain except the Belfast cinema, and would be contracting the management of the cinemas to Odeon. UCI's Tallaght cinema, the first opened in the country, was closed on 8 March 2010 after the landlords gave the company notice that their lease would not be renewed. On 31 May 2011, Odeon announced that it had bought back the UCI chain in Ireland (including the Storm Cinemas-branded locations) from Entertainment Enterprises.

Irish cinemas were re-branded under the Odeon name in 2012 to coincide with the new cinema opening at the Point Village in Dublin, as of the end of 2013 the UCI name is no longer used in any cinemas in the UK & Ireland, all are now branded Odeon.

The Odeon in-house magazine "Onscreen" was re-branded and re-launched as "Odeon" magazine in 2012.

In early 2019, the three cinemas in Austria were sold and rebranded as part of Cineplexx Cinemas.

Current locations

Brazil
 Belém - Shopping Bosque Grão-Pará
 Campo Grande - Shopping Bosque dos Ipês
 Canoas - Park Shopping Canoas
 Curitiba – Shopping Estação, Shopping Palladium
 Fortaleza – Shopping Iguatemi Fortaleza, Shopping Parangaba
 Juiz de Fora – Shopping Independência
 Manaus - Sumaúma Park Shopping
 Recife – Shopping Recife, Shopping Plaza Casaforte, SHopping Tacarauna
 Ribeirão Preto – Ribeirão Shopping
 Rio de Janeiro – New York City Center, NorteShopping, Park Shopping Campo Grande
 Salvador – Shopping da Bahia, Shopping Paralela, Shopping Barra
 São Luís - Shopping da Ilha
 São Paulo – Shopping Jardim Sul, Shopping Anália Franco, Santana Parque Shopping

Germany

 Bad Oeynhausen
 Berlin – am Eastgate
 Berlin – Colosseum
 Berlin – Gropius Passagen
 Berlin – Mercedes Platz
 Bochum – Ruhrpark
 Cottbus – am Lausitz Park
 Dessau-Roßlau – Dessau
 Dresden – Elbe Park
 Düsseldorf
 Duisburg
 Flensburg
 Gera
 Hamburg – Mundsburg
 Hamburg – Othmarschen Park
 Hamburg – Smart City (Wandsbek)
 Hürth – Hürth-Park
 Kaiserslautern
 Leipzig – Günthersdorf Nova Eventis
 Neuss
 Nordhorn
 Paderborn
 Potsdam
 Wilhelmshaven

Italy
 Alessandria
 Arezzo 
 Bari 
 Bologna 
 Bolzano 
 Cagliari
 Casalecchio di Reno
 Casoria
 Catania
 Como
 Curno 
 Fano
 Ferrara
 Fiume Veneto
 Florence
 Genoa
 Gioia del Colle
 Gualtieri
 Iesi
 Lissone
 Marcianise
 Marcon 
 Matera 
 Milan
 Molfetta
 Moncalieri
 Orio al Serio
 Palermo
 Piacenza
 Pioltello
 Perugia
 Porto Sant'Elpidio
 Reggio Emilia
 Rome
 Savignano sul Rubicone
 Sinalunga
 Turin
 Verona
 Vicenza
 Villesse

Portugal
 Amadora (Lisbon)
 Lisbon
 Vila Nova de Gaia (Porto)

References

External links
 UCI Cinemas (Brazil)
 UCI Kinowelt (Germany)
 UCI Cinemas (Italy)
 UCI Cinemas (Portugal)
 Odeon Cinemas Group

AMC Theatres
Cinema chains in Austria
Cinema chains in Brazil
Cinema chains in Germany
Cinema chains in Italy
Cinema chains in Portugal
Entertainment companies established in 1988
Former cinema chains in the Republic of Ireland
Former cinema chains in the United Kingdom
2004 mergers and acquisitions